All Saints Church is a church in the village of Maidstone (eThekwini Metropolitan Municipality) on the Dolphin Coast in the Anglican Diocese of Natal in KwaZulu Natal, South Africa.

History 
Maidstone in KwaZulu Natal was named after Maidstone in Kent in the UK.  It was a model village built exclusively for the white community who worked for the Tongaat Sugar Company.  All Saints was likewise named after its English namesake in Kent.

In 1930, thirty-eight members of the sugar mill staff signed a petition asking for a central church to be built. They argued that a church would have a good moral and social influence on the community and would be a welcome addition to the district's architecture. The petition was granted by the Tongaat Sugar Company. Land was subsequently bought by Thomas Hamlyn, who farmed at Frasers, from Edward Saunders, owner of the Tongaat Sugar Estate.  In granting the petition one of the company's stipulations was that the building had to have a tiled roof and the walls were to be a least nine inches thick. The directors of the company also reserved the right to intervene should the grounds or buildings not remain in a state of proper repair.

The cornerstone was laid in early 1932 but stopped in June of that year when several workmen fell ill with malaria. Work resumed in July and was sufficiently complete by October the following year (1933) for an opening ceremony.  The first priest, the Revd Roderick Davies, furnished the interior through generous donations. All Saints Maidstone was dedicated with the prayer used in 1395 at the dedication of All Saints Maidstone in Kent. All Saints fell under the Parish of Verulam as a chapelry.

Furnishings 
In the ensuing years stained-glass windows and plaques were added in memory of some of the families who helped establish the church.  Seventy teak chairs were replaced with nineteen pews made of afromasia in 1965.

Upon entering the church the carved reredos can be seen behind the altar, commissioned in the 1950s and carved by the sculptor, Mary Stainbank.  The reredos shows twelve figures, six on either side of Jesus, some major, other minor saints, representing different races and ages, both male and female.

Later developments 
In the early 1970s a commission was set up by Michael Nuttall, bishop of Natal to investigate parish boundaries. There were two problematic parishes on the north coast, namely Verulam and Stanger, with the boundary between the two running through the future town of Ballitoville (now Ballito). The commission recommended in 1972 that the parish boundary between Verulam and Stanger should simply be the Umhlali River.  All Saints fell under St Thomas Verulam along with St Catherine Mt Edgecombe.  The commission suggested that All Saints Maidstone and All Souls Umhlali become separate parishes.  All Saints was made a parish in 1994.

However various rectors of St Thomas Verulam, resided in the vicarage alongside All Saints' church in Maidstone, for a number of years, notwithstanding the fact that the parish was still officially designated Parish of Verulam till 1994; They were the reverends

 Graham Ronald McCollum  1972 – 1980
 William George Hardwick 1981 – 1985
 Charles Ernest van Heerden 1986 – 1990
 Arthur Henderson Gosling 1992 – 1998.

Thereafter the following priests were in residence at Parish of Maidstone, and all officiated under the oversight of the archdeacon.

 Ivan Ruiters 1999 - 2000
 Ivan Gunkel 2001 - 2003
 Neville Pike 2009 - 2011

As the Parish of Verulam, St Thomas’ was the parish church. The vicarage was moved from Verulam to Maidstone in 1963, and where All Saints’ Church was receiving greater support. In 1992 All Saints' was made the parish church, and so giving the name to the parish.

Upon the retirement of Arthur Gosling in 1998 it was decided that Maidstone would not have an incumbent, but instead would be cared for by the archdeacon. This decision was reversed in 2012 when Peter Gunning was appointed rector.

Threat and recovery 
All Saints faced closure in 2003 with the congregation having dwindled to about ten regular members.  The church was no longer able to afford a stipendiary priest and was given a year to reverse the slide. Consequently, All Saints was linked with the parish of All Souls Umhlali and came under the oversight of the incumbent rector of All Souls Umhlali.  All Saints was faithfully served by non-stipendiary clergy in the area and gradually the turn-around happened.  The congregation is now thoroughly multi-racial, drawn from Maidstone and Upper Tongaat, but also from as far away as Ballito, Westbrook and Salt Rock.

Clergy 

The following clergy were incumbents, vicars, rectors or priests-in-charge of the Parish of Verulam or its successor, Maidstone:
1889-1890 :  The Revd Mr Henry John Shildrick
1893-1911 :  The Revd Mr Frank Dowling
1912-1920    The Revd Mr Edward Harry Steele
1920-1928 :  The Revd Mr Henry Merriman Waters
1928-1933 :  The Revd Mr Roderic Hugh Davies
1934 1940 :  The Revd Mr George Ernest Bruce Mort
1940-1943 :  The Revd Mr James Reginald Truscott
1943-1946 :  The Revd Mr Corney John Durham
1946-1952 :  The Revd Mr Charles Taylor Stanham
1952-1961 :  The Revd Mr Alfred Frederick Cox
1962-1968 :  The Revd Mr Harold Clive Clark
1968-1971 :  The Revd Mr Francis Ayland Oulds
1972-1980 :  The Revd Mr Graham Ronald McCollum
1981-1985 :  The Revd Canon William George Hardwick
1986-1990 :  The Revd Mr Charles Ernest van Heerden
1991-1998 :  The Revd Mr Arthur Henderson Gosling
2000 -           The Revd Mr Ivan Ruiters
2001 -           The Revd Mr Ivan Gunkel
2003-2006 :  Archdeacon Colin Peattie, with the Revd Mr John Alexander
2006 -           Archdeacon Rob Taylor, with the Revd Mr Neville Pike
2008 -           Archdeacon Rob Jobling, with the Revd Mr Neville Pike and the Rt Revd Peter Harker
2011 -           Archdeacon Peter Houston
2012 - 2016  The Revd Canon Peter Gunning
2017 -           The Revd Mr Siyabonga Mdluli with the Revd Mrs Irene Joss

References

Sources

Further reading 

 

1933 establishments in South Africa
Anglican church buildings in South Africa
Churches in KwaZulu-Natal
Churches completed in 1933
eThekwini Metropolitan Municipality
20th-century religious buildings and structures in South Africa